Ibrahimpatnam is a suburb of Hyderabad in Ranga Reddy district of the Indian state of Telangana. It is located in Ibrahimpatnam mandal of Ibrahimpatnam revenue division.

Geography 

Transport 
Malakpet railway station is the nearest station to the town, located at a distance of 25 km. It is under the administration of Malakpet railway division of South Central Railway zone. TSRTC operates city buses from Ibrahimpatnam to various places.

Politics 

Manchireddy Kishan Reddy is the current Member of Legislative Assembly from the area.

References 

Villages in Ranga Reddy district